Fritz Plato (1858 – 1938) was a German chemist. The unit for specific gravity of liquids,  degree Plato, is named after him.

Plato made a career as a civil servant in professions related to chemistry and was a civil servant.

References

1858 births
1938 deaths
19th-century German chemists
20th-century German chemists